Les Grandes-Ventes is a commune in the Seine-Maritime department in the Normandy region in northern France.

Geography

Heraldry

Population

Places of interest
 The château de La Heuze.
 Vestiges of the priory of St-Marguerite, now a farm.
 The chapel de La Haye-le-Comte, dating from the seventeenth century.
 The church of Notre-Dame, dating from the sixteenth century.

Twin towns
 Osterwieck, in Germany.

See also
Communes of the Seine-Maritime department

References

External links

Communes of Seine-Maritime